Srgjan Kerim (born December 12, 1948) is a Macedonian diplomat, economist, former Foreign Minister and President of the 62nd Session of the United Nations General Assembly. His term of office began on September 18, 2007 and ended on September 16, 2008. He is of Macedonian Turkish descent.

Education
Kerim’s academic career started in 1972 at the Faculty of Economics at the University of Belgrade as Assistant and later as Professor in the Department for International Economic Relations. He was also a visiting professor at the University of Hamburg (Germany) and at New York University.

In the course of the last decade he delivered over 100 lectures at international conferences on issues such as globalization, emerging markets, sustainable development, climate change etc. From 2011 until 2014 he was professor of International Economics and International Relations at FON University in Macedonia. He is currently teaching Development of Global Businesses at the South East European University in Macedonia.

Srgjan Kerim holds a Ph.D. in Economic Sciences from the Faculty of Economics at the University of Belgrade.

Career

Academic career
Kerim’s academic career started in 1972 at the Faculty of Economics at the University of Belgrade as Assistant and later as Professor in the Department for International Economic Relations. He was also a visiting professor at the University of Hamburg (Germany) and at New York University.

In the course of the last decade he delivered over 100 lectures at international conferences on issues such as globalization, emerging markets, sustainable development, climate change etc. From 2011 until 2014 he was professor of International Economics and International Relations at FON University in Macedonia. He is currently teaching Development of Global Businesses at the South East European University in Macedonia.

Political and diplomatic career
Between 1976 and 1978 Kerim was a member of the Presidency of the Youth Federation of Yugoslavia and President of the Foreign Policy Committee. In 1986 he was appointed Minister of Foreign Economic Relations in the Government of the Socialist Republic of Macedonia and served in this position until 1989.

Kerim also represented North Macedonia as Ambassador to Germany (1994-2000), to Switzerland and Liechtenstein (1995-2000).

Kerim’s first duty related to multilateral diplomacy was as Advisor to the President of the Sixth Session of the United Nations Conference on Trade and Development (UNCTAD VI), held in 1983 in Belgrade.

From 1988 to 1991 he served as Deputy Minister and Spokesman of the Federal Ministry of Foreign Affairs of the Federal Republic of Yugoslavia in charge of multilateral affairs (including participation in the UN, G-77 and Non-Aligned Movement activities).

In 1990 he was part of the team responsible for preparation and participation at the first OSCE conference on economic cooperation, held in Bonn. He also took part in the negotiations with EU (then EC) on the Association Agreement between Yugoslavia and EU (1989–91).

During his mandate as Macedonian Ambassador to Germany, he also served as Special Envoy of Stability Pact for South Eastern Europe (1999-2000).

From 2000 to 2001, Kerim was Minister of Foreign Affairs of North Macedonia.  He then chaired the Southeastern European Cooperation Initiative (2000-2001). During this period North Macedonia signed the Stabilisation and Association Agreement with the EU.

He then became Ambassador and Permanent Representative of North Macedonia to the United Nations (2001-2003). He then served as Vice-chairman both of the International Conference on Financing for Development (Monterrey, 2002) and of the World Summit on Sustainable Development (Johannesburg, 2002). In addition, he was a member of the group of facilitators to the President of the Fifty-sixth UN General Assembly, focusing on UN reform, and was a co-organizer of the Regional Forum on Dialogue Among Civilizations (Ohrid, 2003).

Between 2008 and 2009 he was Special Envoy of the UN Secretary General on Climate Change. Since 2008 Kerim has been a member of the Council of Presidents of the United Nations General Assembly.

President of the United Nations General Assembly

From 2007 to 2008 Kerim was President of the 62nd Session of the United Nations General Assembly in New York. In his opening at the beginning of the 62nd Session, he outlined five priority issues:

"I have identified: climate change; financing for development and achieving the Millennium Development Goals; countering terrorism; and the reform agenda – to renewing the management, effectiveness and coherence of this organisation."

In July 2008,  years ago, Kerim declared that it had been estimated:

"that there would be between 50 million and 200 million environmental migrants by 2010."

Business career 
Between 1992 and 1994 Kerim worked as Vice-President of “Copechim-France” in Paris.

In 2003 he was appointed as Special Envoy of the WAZ Media Group for Southeastern Europe and General Manager of ‘Ost Holding GmbH,’ based in Vienna. From 2003 to 2012 he served as General Manager of the subsidiary ‘Media Print Macedonia.’ In 2004 he was also appointed as Chairman of the Board at WAZ Media Group subsidiary ‘Politika Newspapers and Magazines’ in Belgrade and served until 2007. From 2004 until 2007 he was the President of the Macedonian-German Economic Association and since 2008 he is the Honorary President. Between 2008 and 2012 he also served as member of the Croatian subsidiary ‘Europa Press Holding.’

Since 2012 Kerim is the President of the Board of Directors of ‘Media Print Macedonia.’

United Nations Secretary-General selection

Srgjan Kerim was nominated on 17 September 2015 by the Government of North Macedonia and was the first candidate to officially put forward his name to be the next UN Secretary-General.  He has thus far proposed the following priorities for the UN:

• Priority 1: Democratic Governance and Reform of the UN

Democracy is the foundation of political stability. It is the main condition for national expression, justice and equality. And as such, it must be preserved as the sanctity of good governance. Opening new horizons means reforming the UN. It is a complex issue and therefore deserves our full attention, especially in the sphere of management reform.

In terms of UN accountability for the cholera outbreak in Haiti, Kerim emphasized the importance of the UN maintaining its authority and reputation by providing full reparations to cholera victims. He skirted UN responsibility for the outbreak by citing lack of organization and issues on the ground in places where the UN provides Peacekeeping.

On the topic of sexual exploitation and abuse by UN peacekeepers, the United States raised a question during UN Secretary General Candidate informal dialogues. Kerim responded to the question on ensuring transparency and accountability by saying that the future SG needs to be "stubborn and not let things go...If there is misunderstanding here and lack of trust here, you must be a trust-builder."

37 human rights organizations recently endorsed a UN Secretary General accountability pledge. This pledge asks the candidates to take action on two human rights violations that have tarnished the United Nations' image: failing to provide remedies for victims of cholera in Haiti, and sexual exploitation and abuse by peacekeepers. Kerim sent a message, responding to Aids Free World and the Institute for Justice & Democracy in Haiti, in which he expressed his "full support for [their] initiative in promoting greater transparency and accountability within the UN system". While he declined to sign onto the pledge, he did pledge to "continue striving for a stronger, more transparent, just, and accountable UN system."

• Priority 2: Security

Security whether local, regional, or global is simply non-negotiable. It is essential for political equality, prosperity and peace. The significance of diplomatic dialogue and multilateral cooperation in achieving a safe world and preventing terrorism is unparalleled and as such it must be guarded ardently. Security ensures effective democratic processes and economic stability.

• Priority 3: Sustainable Development and Climate Change

Climate change is far more than just another environmental issue. It cuts across all sectors – energy, agriculture, security and trade. Climate change threatens markets, economies and developmental goals. It can deplete food and water supplies, provoke conflict and migration, destabilize fragile societies, and even topple governments. Is this mere exaggeration? Not to the hungry residents of northern Kenya or the increasingly careworn farmers of California. Not to the citizens of the Maldives, already wondering whether their homeland will be diminished by the ocean, or the millions of people living in the metropolitan areas. Not to the hundreds of millions of the world’s poorest who have little defense mechanism against the storms, floods and droughts that each year keep on intensifying in scope.

Addressing Climate Change and enhancement of Financing for Development (FfD) should always be among our top priorities. The nexus between these core issues is fundamental to implementing the post 2015 sustainable development agenda as an imperative for global cooperation and partnership.

• Priority 4: Gender Equality, Education and Citizen Participation

Instead of simply discussing gender equality, we need to take action in achieving gender consciousness and reaching a proportional equilibrium between men and women not only in the UN, but in all spheres of political, social, economic and cultural governance. Furthermore, the strive for achieving gender consciousness is intractably connected to education. If humanity can be overcome by an insatiable desire for knowledge we will have not only an informed and educated citizenry but conscious constituents ready for inclusion and participation in all social processes. As policy makers we must place health and education high on the political agenda and provide the necessary conditions that every individual contributes positively to society.

• Priority 5: Migration

In the contemporary world, the social phenomenon of mobility and relocation is referred to as migration. Nevertheless, misunderstandings and mutual disrespect between people who have planted roots in different nooks and crannies on this Earth stem from our ignorance of the fact that the entire history of mankind is one extensive and constant moving act, all in search of a better habitat.

References

External links

Balkan diplomat seeks to open UN doors, BBC News, 8 November 2007

|-

1948 births
Ambassadors of North Macedonia to Germany
Ambassadors of North Macedonia to Switzerland
Ambassadors of North Macedonia to Liechtenstein
Foreign Ministers of North Macedonia
Government ministers of Yugoslavia
Living people
Macedonian Muslims
Macedonian diplomats
Macedonian people of Turkish descent
Macedonian Turks
Diplomats from Skopje
Permanent Representatives of North Macedonia to the United Nations
Presidents of the United Nations General Assembly
Grand Crosses with Star and Sash of the Order of Merit of the Federal Republic of Germany
University of Belgrade Faculty of Economics alumni
Academic staff of the University of Belgrade
Special Envoys of the Secretary-General of the United Nations